Bhimsain (born Bhimsain Khurana; November 24, 1936 – April 17, 2018) was an Indian film director, producer, screenwriter and animator. He is best known as the pioneer of Indian animation, along with his mentor Ram Mohan. He was the recipient of 16 President's National Awards for his contributions to Indian cinema.

He is best known for directing the critically acclaimed Gharaonda (1977) starring Amol Palekar and Zarina Wahab, and Dooriyaan (1979) starring Sharmila Tagore and Uttam Kumar. He is also known for creating the animation short film Ek Anek Aur Ekta (1974) which aired on Doordarshan in the 70s. Bhimsain has also directed India's largest animation series Vartmaan (1994).

Early life 
Born in Multan (now in Pakistan) in 1936, Bhimsain moved to Lucknow after the partition. Belonging to family of artists, he gravitated to arts and music early, studying fine arts and learning classical music at the Lucknow College of Arts and Crafts which held him in good stead throughout his life. In 1961, Bhimsain moved to Mumbai after he secured a job at the Films Division of India as background painter. It is here that he learned the art and craft of animation filmmaking, under the mentorship of Ram Mohan.

Career 
Bhimsain made his debut with the animation short The Climb (1970) which earned him the Silver Hugo Award at the Chicago International Film Festival.

Soon after, he directed and produced several animation and ad films. He further established his repute as a director and producer with his landmark animation short Ek Anek Aur Ekta (1974). This film got him another National Film Award in the same year and has had over 500 screening on Doordarshan.

In 1976, Bhimsain produced and directed his first feature film Gharaonda (1977). It was written by Academy Award-winner Gulzar and starred Amol Palekar and Zarina Wahab. It received more than 30 awards including 5 Filmfare awards. This was followed by two other feature films, of which Doooriyan received an additional Filmfare award.

In 1985, Bhimsain ventured in television production with the sitcom Chhoti Badi Baatein (1986) based on superstitions. During the same period he also made several documentaries like Der Aaye Durust Aaye, Shaadi Shaadi, Jeevan Rahasya, Setu and Roshni. His documentary Kathni Karni Eksi fetched him two National Film Awards in 1990.

In 1991, he created India's first computer aided animation series Lok Gatha based on folk tales. This series received 3 National awards. Apart from this he also made India's largest animation project till date in the form of a 26-episode series Vartmaan aired on Doordarshan.

Personal 
He is father of filmmaker Kireet Khurana, and grandfather of Kabeer Khurana.

Filmography

As director 

 Orchestra (Short) (2001)
 The Prince and the Magician (Short) (1998)
 Locked (Short) (1997)
 Common Man (TV Movie) (1997)
 Vartmaan (TV Series) (1994)
 Lok Gatha (TV Series) (1992)
 Kathni Karni Eksi (Documentary) (1989)
 Roshni (Documentary) (1988)
 Setu (Documentary) (1987)
 Chhoti Badi Baatein (TV Series) (1986)
 Tum Laut Aao  (1983)
 Jivan Rahasya  (1982)
 Shaadi Shaadi  (1982)
 Der Aaye Durust Aaye (1981)
 Doooriyan  (1979)
 Gharaonda (1977)
 Business Is People  (1976)
 Munni  (1975)
 Ek Anek Aur Ekta (Short) (1974)
 Flowers Everywhere - 1973
 Mehmaan (1972)
 The Fire  (Short) (1972)
 Ek Do  (1971)
 Kahani Har Zamane Ki  (1971)
 Na  (1971)
 The Climb (1970)

As producer 

 Trade (Short) (1998)
 The Prince and the Magician (Short) (1998)
 Locked (Short) (1997)
 O (Short) (1995)
 Vartmaan (TV Series) (1994)
 Mahagiri (Short) (1994)
 Chhoti Badi Baatein (TV Series) (1986)
 Doooriyan (1979)
 Gharaonda (1977)
 Munni (1975)
 Ek Anek Aur Ekta (Short) (1974)
 The Fire  (1972)
 The Climb  (1970)

References 

1936 births
2018 deaths
Indian animators
Indian filmmakers
Indian film producers
Indian animated film directors
Indian animated film producers
Film directors from Mumbai
University of Lucknow alumni
Indian film directors